Detroit Leadership Academy is a free public charter school located in Detroit, MI. The school was opened in 2012 through the YMCA  and currently serves students in Pre-K - 11th grade at two campuses on the city's west side. and is managed by Equity Education.

References

Schools in Michigan